Charles William Dorman (April 23, 1898 – November 15, 1928) was a catcher in Major League Baseball. Nicknamed "Slats", he played for the Chicago White Sox in 1923.

References

External links

1898 births
1928 deaths
Major League Baseball catchers
Chicago White Sox players
Baseball players from San Francisco